Mount Little is located at the Northern end of Kootenay National Park on the border of Alberta and British Columbia. It was named in 1916 after George F. Little, a member of the first ascent party.


See also
 List of peaks on the British Columbia–Alberta border

References

Further reading
 Dave Birrell, 50 Roadside Panoramas in the Canadian Rockies, P 87

Three-thousanders of Alberta
Three-thousanders of British Columbia
Mountains of Banff National Park
Kootenay National Park
Canadian Rockies